Range Ponds State Park is a public recreation area wrapping around the eastern end of Lower Range Pond in the town of Poland in Androscoggin County, Maine. The state park offers a sandy beach with lifeguard-supervised swimming, kayaking, limited motorized boating, hiking trails, and fishing. Mountain biking trails, built with the help of local volunteers, provide intermediate level, single-track loops off a central double-track trail that winds through mature pine and hardwood forests.

History
The park was created after the State Park and Recreation Commission acquired over 500 acres of land bordering Lower Range Pond in 1965 from Hiram Ricker and Sons, bottlers of Poland Spring Water.

Range Ponds

The three Range Ponds are at the same elevation and connected by narrow necks where bridges carry roads over the pond. Flow sequence is from the upper pond through the middle pond to the lower pond which overflows through Range Brook to the Little Androscoggin River in Mechanic Falls  to the north. The ponds have native populations of chain pickerel, white perch, and smallmouth bass, and have been stocked with brown trout and largemouth bass. These species of angling interest prey on native rainbow smelt and stocked alewife. Stocking with rainbow trout and land-locked Atlantic salmon has been discontinued.

Upper Range Pond
Upper Range Pond is the shallowest of the three ponds. It is the southernmost pond, and the north end connects to the middle pond.

Middle Range Pond
Middle Range Pond extends from the upper pond at its southern end to the lower pond at its northern end. Maine State Route 26 bridges the narrows where the middle pond connects to the lower pond. Middle pond is the largest and deepest of the three, and supports some lake trout. There is no spawning or nursery habitat for brook trout, but the species is regularly stocked for angling. Black crappie were illegally introduced to the middle pond in the early 21st century.

Lower Range Pond
Covering , Lower Range Pond is the smallest, but longest, of the three; and forms the top of a "T" with the middle and lower ponds. The north end of the middle pond connects to a short bay on the southwest side of the lower pond. The state park is on the northeast shore and southeast end of the lower pond, while the northwest end of the lower pond overflows as Range Brook.

See also
 List of Hiking Trails in Maine

References

External links
Range Ponds State Park Department of Agriculture, Conservation and Forestry

Beaches of Maine
State parks of Maine
Poland, Maine
Hiking trails in Maine
Protected areas of Androscoggin County, Maine